Arthur Goldreich (25 December 1929 – 24 May 2011) was a South African-Israeli abstract painter and a key figure in the anti-apartheid movement in the country of his birth and a critic of the form of Zionism practiced in Israel.

Early life
Goldreich was born in Pietersburg, South Africa, and settled in Palestine, where he participated in the 1948 Arab-Israeli war as a member of the Palmach, the elite military wing of the Haganah. In time he became a leading figure at Bezalel Academy in Jerusalem. In 1966, he became the head of Industrial and Environmental Design Department, which he helped transform into an internationally recognized center for design.

By the age of 33, Goldreich had moved back to South Africa where he became one of the country's most successful artists. In 1955, he won South Africa's Best Young Painter Award for his figures in black and white, but to the Prime Minister Hendrik Verwoerd's government, he was a key suspect in the clandestine operations of the anti-apartheid underground.

Escape from jail 

Goldreich and Harold Wolpe, a lawyer, used South African Communist Party funds to buy Liliesleaf Farm in Rivonia for use as a secret meeting place by leaders of the banned African National Congress (ANC) and its armed wing, Umkhonto we Sizwe. Goldreich and Wolpe also helped locate sabotage sites for Umkhonto we Sizwe, the military arm of the ANC, and draft a disciplinary code for guerrillas.

In 1963, Liliesleaf Farm was raided by the police, leading to the arrest of most of the ANC leadership, including Goldreich. Wolpe was arrested shortly after the raid and was held with Goldreich at Marshall Square prison in the city.

The two met up with Moosa Moolla and Abdulhay Jassat, members of the Natal Indian Congress, allied to the African National Congress. Moola and Jassat had been held in solitary confinement, where they had been tortured (they were believed to be the first political activists tortured in South African jails). Eventually the four men, working together with the aid of a prison warden, escaped successfully from custody, splitting up outside the prison (with Goldreich disguised as a priest). 

Wolpe and Goldreich spent several days hiding in and around Johannesburg's suburbs to avoid capture. Eventually, they were driven to Swaziland, and from there were flown to Botswana, still disguised as priests to avoid being identified by potentially pro-South African British colonial authorities (at this time Swaziland was not independent).

Criticism of Israel 

According to The Guardian, by February 2006, Goldreich was living in the city of Herzliya. "There was a time when he believed the young Jewish state might provide the example of a better way for the country of his birth. As it is, Goldreich sees Israel as closer to the white regime he fought against and modern South Africa as providing the model. Israeli governments, he says, ultimately proved more interested in territory than peace, and along the way Zionism mutated.

Goldreich speaks of the 'bantustanism we see through a policy of occupation and separation', the 'abhorrent' racism in Israeli society all the way up to cabinet ministers who advocate the forced removal of Arabs, and 'the brutality and inhumanity of what is imposed on the people of the occupied territories of Palestine'. 'Don't you find it horrendous that this people and this state, which only came into existence because of the defeat of fascism and Nazism in Europe, and in the conflict six million Jews paid with their lives for no other reason than that they were Jews, is it not abhorrent that in this place there are people who can say these things and do these things?' he asks.

References 

People of the Israeli–Palestinian conflict
Palmach members
South African artists
Modern artists
People from Johannesburg
South African Jews
Jewish socialists
1929 births
2011 deaths
South African emigrants to Mandatory Palestine
South African escapees
Escapees from South African detention
Jewish South African anti-apartheid activists
G
UMkhonto we Sizwe personnel